The 2015–16 Basketbol Süper Ligi was the 50th season of the top-tier professional basketball league in Turkey. The season started on October 10, 2015 and ended on June 13, 2016. Fenerbahçe won its 7th national championship this season.

This was the first season the league's name was Basketbol Süper Ligi (BSL) instead of Turkish Basketball League (TBL).

Teams

Promotion and relegation
Relegated to TBL
Eskişehir Basket (15th)
Tofaş (16th)
Promoted from TBL
Akın Çorap Yeşilgiresun Belediyespor (1st)
Demir İnşaat Büyükçekmece (2nd)

Locations and stadia

Personnel and kits

Regular season

League table

Results

Playoffs

Clubs in European competitions

All-Star Game

References

External links
Official Site
TBLStat.net History Page

Turkish Basketball Super League seasons
Turkish
1